Torodora pseudogalera is a moth in the family Lecithoceridae. It is found in Taiwan. It is similar to Torodora galera from China but slightly larger and with some differences in male genitalia.

Description

References

Torodora
Moths of Taiwan
Moths described in 2004